Fairlawn is a village in Pawtucket, Rhode Island USA.

History
The historic Fairlawn Rovers, a professional soccer team, was based in Fairlawn from at least 1918 to at least 1949.  The Fairlawn Elementary School and the Fairlawn Golf Course are also located in the area.

References

External links
Fairlawn Golf Course

Villages in Providence County, Rhode Island
Villages in Rhode Island